614 may refer to:

 614 (number), a number in the 600s
 AD 614, the 614th year of the Common Era
 614 BC, the 614th year before the common era
 614th (disambiguation)
 614 Pia, asteroid #614, the 614th asteroid registered, a main-belt asteroid
 Area code 614, a telephone area code in the North American numbering plan, serving Columbus, Ohio, USA
 Route 614, see List of highways numbered 614
 No. 614 Volunteer Gliding Squadron RAF, British Royal Air Force unit
 No. 614 Squadron RAF, British Royal Air Force unit
 Type 614 research vessel, a ship class of the People's Liberation Army Navy of the People's Republic of China
 DB Class 614, diesel multiple unit train set class of Deutsche Bundesbahn
 Chesapeake and Ohio 614, a steam locomotive train engine
 Bus route 614, one of two The Comet routes operated by Uno of Hertfordshire

See also

 D614G mutation of the COVID-19 virus SARS-CoV-2, which became dominant in the summer of 2020
 , a post-Cold-War French navy ship with pennant D614, numbered 614
 , a Cold-War U.S. Navy submarine pennant SSN614, numbered 614
 , a post-WWII British Royal Navy ship with pennant K614, numbered 614
 , a WWI U.S. Navy speedboat pennat SP614, numbered 614
 , a post-WWII French navy submarine pennant S614, numbered 614
 Minuscule 614, a Greek manuscript of the New Testament
 Uppland Runic Inscription 614